Bojardi is an Italian surname.

People with this surname include:

 Carlo Bojardi, 15th-century bishop of the Roman Catholic Archdiocese of Modena-Nonantola
 Gherardo Bojardi (15th century) . a Councilor of Marquis Niccolò of Ferrara, see Roman Catholic Archdiocese of Ferrara-Comacchio
 Nicolò Bojardi, 15th-century bishop of the Roman Catholic Archdiocese of Modena-Nonantola
 Ottorino Bojardi, soccer player for A.C. Reggiana 1919
 Pietro Bojardi, 15th-century bishop of the Roman Catholic Archdiocese of Modena-Nonantola and archbishop of the Roman Catholic Archdiocese of Ferrara-Comacchio

See also
 Boiardi (surname), an Italian surname
 Boiardo (surname), an Italian surname

Italian-language surnames